Mangelia paciniana is a species of sea snail, a marine gastropod mollusk in the family Mangeliidae.

Description
The length of the shell attains 6 mm, its diameter 2.75 mm.

The whorls of the oblong, turreted shell are not shouldered, but ribbed as in Mangelia vauquelini, not striate. Its color is yellowish or whitish, with brown revolving lines. The whorls are slightly convex, anteriorly subangular. They are crossed by many longitudinal, pronounced, oblique and undulated ribs. The surface is smooth, even under magnifying lens. The oval aperture is oblong. The siphonal canal is wide and very short. The outer lip has a characteristic tooth, situated at the entrance of the sinus.

Distribution
This species occurs in European waters and in the Mediterranean Sea.

References

 Gofas, S.; Le Renard, J.; Bouchet, P. (2001). Mollusca, in: Costello, M.J. et al. (Ed.) (2001). European register of marine species: a check-list of the marine species in Europe and a bibliography of guides to their identification. Collection Patrimoines Naturels, 50: pp. 180–213

External links
  Tucker, J.K. 2004 Catalog of recent and fossil turrids (Mollusca: Gastropoda). Zootaxa 682:1–1295.
 

paciniana
Gastropods described in 1839